The 1954–55 season was the 40th in the history of the Isthmian League, an English football competition.

Walthamstow Avenue were champions, winning their third Isthmian League title.

League table

Team kits

References

Isthmian League seasons
I